800 series may refer to:

Japanese train types
 800 Series Shinkansen
 Chichibu Railway 800 series electric multiple unit
 Choshi Electric Railway 800 series electric multiple unit
 Keihan 800 series electric multiple unit
 Keikyu 800 series electric multiple unit
 Shin-Keisei N800 series electrical multiple unit
 Tobu 800 series, a variant of the Tobu 8000 series electric multiple unit

Other
 GeForce 800M series of graphics processing units
 ThinkPad 800 series, a line of laptop computers
 Rover 800 Series car
 Sony Vaio 800 series computers

See also
 British Rail Class 800
 800 (disambiguation)